Hydrellia valida is a species of shore flies in the family Ephydridae.

Distribution
United States.

References

Ephydridae
Taxa named by Hermann Loew
Insects described in 1862
Diptera of North America